Patrick Kay (born September 19, 1993) is a Canadian rugby union player, in the sevens discipline.

Career
Kay was part of Canada's 2018 Commonwealth Games, with the team getting knocked out in the group stage.

Kay won silver as part of Canada's team at the 2019 Pan American Games in Lima.

In June 2021, Kay was named to Canada's 2020 Olympic team.

References

1993 births
Living people
Rugby sevens players at the 2018 Commonwealth Games
Commonwealth Games rugby sevens players of Canada
Canada international rugby sevens players
Rugby sevens players at the 2019 Pan American Games
Pan American Games silver medalists for Canada
Medalists at the 2019 Pan American Games
Pan American Games medalists in rugby sevens
People from Duncan, British Columbia
Rugby sevens players at the 2020 Summer Olympics
Olympic rugby sevens players of Canada